The 1988 Clásica de San Sebastián was the 8th edition of the Clásica de San Sebastián cycle race and was held on 13 August 1988. The race started and finished in San Sebastián. The race was won by Gert-Jan Theunisse of the PDM team.

General classification

References

Clásica de San Sebastián
San